Boa Esperança is a settlement in the southwestern part of the Lobata District on São Tomé Island in São Tomé and Príncipe. Its population is 97 (2012 census). It lies 4 km northwest of Monte Café, 5 km southwest of Agostinho Neto and 9 km east of Neves.

Population history

References

Populated places in Lobata District